Jarklin is a locality in north central Victoria, Australia.

References

External links

Towns in Victoria (Australia)
Shire of Loddon